DR Music (formerly known as DR Entertainment; Hangul: DR뮤직), is a South Korean private-held music company established in 1989 by Yoon Deung-ryeong. It currently manages girl group Blackswan and co-ed group K-Tigers Zero.
.

The label is formerly home to acts such artists such as Baby V.O.X, A4, Zhang Liyin, As One, and Baby Vox Re.V.

Artists

Groups
Blackswan
K-Tigers Zero

Soloists
Fatou

Former artists 
 Baby V.O.X. (1997–2006)
 A4 (1999-2001)
 Zhang Liyin (2002–2003)
 As One (2004–2005)
 Baby V.O.X. Re.V (2007–2009)
 Rania / BP Rania / Blackswan
 Joy (2011-2012)
 Riko (2011-2013)
 Jooyi (2011-2015)
 Di (2011-2016)
 T-ae (2011-2016)
 Xia (2011-2016)
 Yina (2011-2014; 2016-2017)
 Alexandra (2015-2017)
 Yumin (2016-2018)
 Ttabo (2016-2018)
 Zi.U (2015-2019)
 Jieun (2015-2019)
 Namfon (2018-2020)
 Seunghyun (2019-2020)
 Hyeme (2015-2020)
 Youngheun (2019-2022)
 Judy (2020-2022)

References

South Korean record labels
Talent agencies of South Korea
Music companies of South Korea
K-pop record labels
Companies based in Seoul
Gangnam District